Front Parlour Ballads is the twelfth studio album by Richard Thompson, recorded in 2004.

Released on the Cooking Vinyl label in August 2005, Front Parlour Ballads was literally a homemade album. Thompson's aim was to create an album that sounded small and intimate. It was hailed as his first solo, all acoustic album since 1981- but strictly speaking it's neither of those things - percussionist Debra Dobkin played on two tracks ("Let It Blow" and "My Soul, My Soul") and Thompson himself added electric guitar to the same two tracks.

Thompson had a small studio built in his garage at home and recorded the tracks onto his laptop computer, adding his own overdubs as he deemed necessary. Dobkin's contributions were recorded in the same way.

Thompson did not expect to sell many copies of Front Parlour Ballads. The critics, as usual, acclaimed the new release, but rather more surprising were strong early sales in both the U.S. and Britain, and Front Parlour Ballads debuted in the indie charts on both sides of the Atlantic.

Track listing
All songs written by Richard Thompson

"Let It Blow"
"For Whose Sake?"
"Miss Patsy"
"Old Thames Side"
"How Does Your Garden Grow?"
"My Soul, My Soul"
"Cressida"
"Row, Boys Row"
"The Boys Of Mutton Street"
"Precious One"
"A Solitary Life"
"Should I Betray?"
"When We Were Boys At School"

Personnel
Richard Thompson – electric guitar, acoustic guitar, mandolin, accordion, bass guitar and vocals
Debra Dobkin – percussion

References 

2005 albums
Richard Thompson (musician) albums
Cooking Vinyl albums